Sep. 12 - Eastern Orthodox liturgical calendar - Sep. 14

All fixed commemorations below celebrated on September 26 by Orthodox Churches on the Old Calendar.

For September 13th, Orthodox Churches on the Old Calendar commemorate the Saints listed on August 31.

Feasts
 Forefeast of the Exaltation of the Cross.

Saints
 Hieromartyr Cornelius the Centurion (1st century)
 Saint Aristides the Athenian, martyr (120)
 Martyrs Serapion, Cronides, and Leontius, of Alexandria (c. 237)  (see also: September 11)
 Martyr Straton of Nicomedia (3rd century)
 Martyr Seleucus of Galatia (320)
 Martyrs Elias, Zoticus, Lucian, Valerian, Macrobius, and Gordian at Tomis in Moesia (320)
 Saint Eulogius I, Patriarch of Alexandria (608)
 Venerable Peter of Atroa, in Bithynia (or of Agrea) (early 9th century)  (see also: January 3)

Pre-Schism Western saints
 Saint Philip, the father of St Eugenia of Rome, in whose home Sts Protus and Hyacinth were employed (3rd century)
 Saint Litorius, Bishop of Tours (370)
 Saint Maurilius of Angers, Bishop of Angers (c. 430)
 Saint Nectarius, Bishop of Autun in France, and a friend of St Germanus of Paris (c. 550)
 Saint Amatus (Amat, Amé, Aimé, Amado), first abbot of Remiremont Abbey (627)
 Saint Venerius the Hermit, a hermit, then abbot on the Island of Tino in the Gulf of Genoa in Italy (c. 630)
 Saint Columbinus, successor of St Deicola as Abbot of Lure in France (c. 680)
 Saint Amatus (Aimé), Abbot of Agaunum, who became the tenth Bishop of Sion in Valais in Switzerland (690)
 Saint Barsenorius, Abbot of La-Croix-Saint-Leuffroi in France (7th century)
 Saint Hedwig (Haduwy), Abbess of Herford Abbey in Westphalia in Germany (c. 887)
 Saint Wilfrida of Wilton (Wulfthryth), Abbess of Wilton Abbey (c. 988)

Post-Schism Orthodox saints
 Saint John of Prislop, Romania (15th-16th centuries)
 Saint Cornelius of Padan-Olonets, disciple of St. Alexander of Svir, and with him Sts. Dionysius and Misael (16th century)
 Saint Meletius I Pegas, Patriarch of Alexandria (1601)
 Great-martyr Ketevan, Queen of Kakheti, Georgia (1624)
 Venerable Hierotheus of Kalamata (Hierotheos the New), monk of Iveron Monastery, Mt. Athos (1745)

New martyrs and confessors
 New Hieromartyrs Stephan Kostogryz and Alexander Aksenov, Priests (1937)
 New Hieromartyr Nicholas Vasyukovich, Deacon (1937)

Other commemorations
 Commemoration of the Founding of the Church of the Resurrection (the Holy Sepulchre) at Jerusalem (335)
 Icon of the Theotokos "Dubovich".
 Repose of Monk Dorotheus, last hermit of the Roslavl Forests (1866)

Icon gallery

Notes

References

Sources
 September 13/September 26. Orthodox Calendar (PRAVOSLAVIE.RU).
 September 26 / September 13. HOLY TRINITY RUSSIAN ORTHODOX CHURCH (A parish of the Patriarchate of Moscow).
 September 13. OCA - The Lives of the Saints.
 The Autonomous Orthodox Metropolia of Western Europe and the Americas (ROCOR). St. Hilarion Calendar of Saints for the year of our Lord 2004. St. Hilarion Press (Austin, TX). p. 68.
 The Thirteenth Day of the Month of September. Orthodoxy in China.
 September 13. Latin Saints of the Orthodox Patriarchate of Rome.
 The Roman Martyrology. Transl. by the Archbishop of Baltimore. Last Edition, According to the Copy Printed at Rome in 1914. Revised Edition, with the Imprimatur of His Eminence Cardinal Gibbons. Baltimore: John Murphy Company, 1916. pp. 281–282.
 Rev. Richard Stanton. A Menology of England and Wales, or, Brief Memorials of the Ancient British and English Saints Arranged According to the Calendar, Together with the Martyrs of the 16th and 17th Centuries. London: Burns & Oates, 1892. p. 447.

 Greek Sources
 Great Synaxaristes:  13 ΣΕΠΤΕΜΒΡΙΟΥ. ΜΕΓΑΣ ΣΥΝΑΞΑΡΙΣΤΗΣ.
  Συναξαριστής. 13 Σεπτεμβρίου. ECCLESIA.GR. (H ΕΚΚΛΗΣΙΑ ΤΗΣ ΕΛΛΑΔΟΣ).
  13/09/. Ορθόδοξος Συναξαριστής.

 Russian Sources
  26 сентября (13 сентября). Православная Энциклопедия под редакцией Патриарха Московского и всея Руси Кирилла (электронная версия). (Orthodox Encyclopedia - Pravenc.ru).
  13 сентября по старому стилю  /  26 сентября по новому стилю. Русская Православная Церковь - Православный церковный календарь на  год.

September in the Eastern Orthodox calendar